Alan Redfearn (born August 1952) is an English former professional rugby league footballer who played in the 1970s and 1980s.

Background
Alan Redfearn's birth was registered in Spen Valley district, West Riding of Yorkshire, England.

Playing career

International honours
Alan Redfearn won caps for England while at Bradford Northern in 1979 against France; in 1980 against France, and won a cap for Great Britain while at Bradford Northern in 1979 against Australia.

Only eight players have ever scored drop goals for England, they are; John Keith Bridges (1), George Fairbairn (1), Bobbie Goulding (1), Sean Long (1), Martin Offiah (1), Harry Pinner (2), Alan Redfearn (1), and Nigel Wright (1).

County Cup Final appearances
Alan Redfearn played , and scored a try in Bradford Northern's 18-8 victory over York in the 1978 Yorkshire County Cup Final during the 1978–79 season at Headingley Rugby Stadium, Leeds on Saturday 28 October 1978, and played , and scored a try in the 5-10 defeat by Castleford in the 1981 Yorkshire County Cup Final during the 1981–82 season at Headingley Rugby Stadium, Leeds on Saturday 3 October 1981.

John Player Trophy Final appearances
Alan Redfearn played  in Bradford Northern's 6-0 victory over Widnes in the 1979–80 John Player Trophy Final during the 1979–80 season at Headingley Rugby Stadium, Leeds on Saturday 5 January 1980.

Genealogical information
Alan Redfearn is the younger brother of the rugby league footballer; David Redfearn.

References

External links
Photograph "Alan Redfearn" at rlhp.co.uk
Photograph "Van Bellen slips the ball" at rlhp.co.uk
Photograph "Alan Redfearn tries to evade Knocker Norton" at rlhp.co.uk
Photograph "Thompson waits" at rlhp.co.uk
Photograph "Fisher double tackled" at rlhp.co.uk
Photograph "Alan Redfearn races clear" at rlhp.co.uk
Photograph "Alan Redfearn dives over" at rlhp.co.uk
Photograph "Alan Redfearn goes over" at rlhp.co.uk
Photograph "Northern celebrate the Championship win" at rlhp.co.uk
Photograph "Keith shows off his award" at rlhp.co.uk
Photograph "'Knocker' held" at rlhp.co.uk
Photograph "Alan Redfearn stopped by the Aussies" at rlhp.co.uk
Photograph "Alan Redfearn signs the ball" at rlhp.co.uk
Photograph "Redfearn held short" at rlhp.co.uk
Photograph "The 1981 squad pictured at Odsal" at rlhp.co.uk
Photograph "Rathbone gets weighed in" at rlhp.co.uk
Photograph "Redfearn Dives Over" at rlhp.co.uk
Photograph "1981 team v. Hull" at rlhp.co.uk
Photograph "Disappointment" at rlhp.co.uk
Photograph "Redfearn in a daze" (image mis-titled) at rlhp.co.uk
Photograph "Alan Redfearn dives over" at rlhp.co.uk
Photograph "Northern's victorious players celebrate" at rlhp.co.uk
Photograph "Is it a try?" at rlhp.co.uk
Photograph "Forsyth about to crash through" at rlhp.co.uk
Photograph "Alan Redfearn offloads" at rlhp.co.uk
Photograph "Rathbone ragged at Widnes" at rlhp.co.uk
Photograph "Peter Fox gives his pre match talk" at rlhp.co.uk
Photograph "New Boot sponsor" (thumbnail and image differ) at rlhp.co.uk
Photograph "Trevor Foster presents supporters club awards" (Date incorrect 1947?) at rlhp.co.uk

1952 births
Living people
Bradford Bulls players
England national rugby league team players
English rugby league players
Great Britain national rugby league team players
Rugby league halfbacks
Rugby league players from Batley